Per Nielsen (5 June 1919 – 27 May 2008) was a Danish sports shooter. He competed at the 1952 Summer Olympics and 1960 Summer Olympics.

References

1919 births
2008 deaths
Danish male sport shooters
Olympic shooters of Denmark
Shooters at the 1952 Summer Olympics
Shooters at the 1960 Summer Olympics
Sportspeople from Aalborg
20th-century Danish people